Eduard Gerhardt (29 April 1813 in Erfurt – 6 March 1888 in Munich) was a German painter,  lithographer and architect.

Biography

He began his career as a lithographer, and then studied architecture at Cologne and under Semper at Dresden. In 1837 or 1838 he took up painting at Munich. A series of views of Cologne Cathedral attracted the attention of Frederick William IV of Prussia, whose assistance enabled Gerhardt to continue his studies in 1848 in Italy and the Iberian Peninsula. For some time he instructed the princes of the royal household at Lisbon, but in 1851 returned to Munich.

Work
He is noted for his portrayal of Moorish architecture. Among his works are:
 “Palace of the Inquisition at Cordova” (1863, Neue Pinakothek)
 “Lion Court at the Alhambra, Granada” (1861, Neue Pinakothek)
 “Saint Marc's, Venice” (1864, Neue Pinakothek)
 “The Alhambra by Moonlight”
 “Generalife”
 “The Comares Tower” (Schack Gallery, Munich)

See also
 List of German painters

Notes

References

External links

1813 births
1888 deaths
19th-century German painters
German male painters
German lithographers
Artists from Erfurt
19th-century German male artists